Diplomatic relations between the People's Republic of China and the Republic of Trinidad and Tobago were established on 20 June 1974.
The Chinese government established an embassy in Port of Spain in April 1975, with Trinidad and Tobago establishing their own embassy in Beijing on 26 February 2014. Prime Minister Eric Williams was the first Trinidadian head of government to visit China in 1974. In 2002, the trade balance between the two countries was US$47.15 million, with China exporting all but $4.81 million of that. The current Chinese ambassador to Trinidad and Tobago is Mr. Yang Youming.

China and Trinidad and Tobago share friendly association with the Chinese-based Shanghai Construction Co. having built the Trinidad & Tobago's prime minister's official residence, otherwise known as the Saint Ann's Diplomatic Centre, and the National Academy for the Performing Arts (NAPA), among other developments.

On 26 February 2014, the Republic of Trinidad and Tobago officially opened its embassy in Beijing (Peking).

See also
 Foreign relations of China
 Foreign relations of Trinidad and Tobago
 Caribbean–China relations

References

Further reading 
 
 

 
Trinidad and Tobago
China, Peoples Republic